Yuvraj Jivabhai Odedra (born December 1997) is an English former first-class cricketer.

Odedra was born at Leicester in December 1997. He was educated in Leicester at St Paul's Catholic School, before going up to Cardiff Metropolitan University. While studying at Cardiff, he made a single appearance in first-class cricket for Cardiff MCCU against Somerset at Taunton in 2019. He took two wickets in the match, dismissing Pakistan batsman Azhar Ali in both Somerset innings'. In addition to playing first-class cricket, Odedra also played minor counties cricket for Wales Minor Counties in 2018, making a single appearance in the Minor Counties Championship.

References

External links

1997 births
Living people
People from Leicester
Alumni of Cardiff Metropolitan University
English cricketers
Wales National County cricketers
Cardiff MCCU cricketers
British sportspeople of Indian descent
British Asian cricketers